Steven Ryan Taylor (born November 9, 1993) is an American cricketer. He was the captain of the United States cricket team but was dismissed from the role in September 2017. He is regarded as one of the best batsmen in USA Cricket History and also as a premier Allrounder in the country with his off-breaks. He made his first-class debut, playing for Jamaica, in the 2017–18 Regional Four Day Competition on November 9, 2017.

Career

Early years
He was born in South Florida to Jamaican parents, Loveth and Sylvan Taylor. Along with being a left-handed batsman he was also a wicketkeeper. He was taught at an early age on the sidelines of grounds around Florida by his father, Sylvan, and later by his mentor, former USA left-handed batsman Mark Johnson. Later, Steven became the first 14-year-old to hit a half century in the South Florida Cricket Alliance (SFCA), Keith Graham Memorial Classic (now the SFCA Sims Cup Classic). This innings, against Pakistan, while representing a SFCA Youth Team, included with 4 fours and 3 sixes off 33 balls and lasted just 41 minutes. He took 212 off Big Broward Cricket Academy, before retiring in the first 40 over match of the tournament. The following day, Taylor came back to produce a knock of 206 against the Atlanta-based Cricket Academy of USA. In the final match against the Michigan Cricket Academy he scored 51. In the SFCA Sims Classic he hit an undefeated 87 against India, and 75 off Pakistan. He is the youngest player in the SFCA Premier Division.

U-19 career
Steven Taylor's first major assignment was the 2010 ICC Under-19 Cricket World Cup in New Zealand, in which he was selected due to great performances. He played in the tournament as a wicketkeeper-batsman.

More recently, Taylor was selected as vice-captain for the ICC Americas Under-19 Championship held in their own ground at Florida, in the 2010–11 season. He was also the wicketkeeper-batsman on that tournament. USA won that tournament unbeaten, and Taylor too had a successful tournament finishing third on the top run-getters' list with 157 runs from 5 games with a top score of 83, and also topped the most dismissals' list with 7 dismissals (5 catches, 2 stumpings) from 5 games.

International career
Following his performances in the domestic and Under-19 arena, he was given the call-up to play in USA's 2010 ICC World Cricket League Division Four campaign, where they had gained promotion from Division Five. USA won the tournament, demolishing Italy in the final, with Taylor playing throughout the tournament.

In the 2011 ICC World Cricket League Division Three, however, USA could not replicate their past success, finishing 5th out of 6 teams. They were thus relegated back to Division Four.

In 2012 Taylor was selected as to be a part of the United States national cricket team at the 2012 ICC World Twenty20 Qualifier in the UAE in March 2012. Later in the same year he was selected for the 2012 ICC World Cricket League Division Four which takes place from September 3 to 10, 2012 in Malaysia.

Taylor became the first U.S. batsman to record a century in Twenty20 competition in the 2013 ICC World Cricket League Americas Region Twenty20 Division One tournament in March 2013. He scored 101 off 62 balls against Bermuda. He added a second century when he scored 127 not out against the Cayman Islands.

Later in the year, he represented the United States in the 2013 ICC World Cricket League Division Three, where he led all batters with 274 runs, for a run rate of 45.66. He scored a century in that tournament when he scored 162 in the opening match against Nepal.

Taylor was named in America's squad for the 2015 ICC World Twenty20 Qualifier, but withdrew after securing a contract with Barbados Tridents in the Caribbean Premier League. He is included in the draft of foreign players for final of Pakistan Super League 2017 at Gaddafi Stadium Lahore to bring back cricket back to Pakistan. In the draft for the 2017 Caribbean Premier League, he was picked in round 8 by the Guyana Amazon Warriors, securing a $30,000 contract.

On May 30, 2017, during the third-place playoff in the 2017 ICC World Cricket League Division Three tournament, Taylor scored his 1,000th run in one-day cricket, becoming the fourth player for the United States to reach the landmark.

In August 2018, he was named in the United States' squad for the 2018–19 ICC World Twenty20 Americas Qualifier tournament in Morrisville, North Carolina. In October 2018, he was named in the United States' squads for the 2018–19 Regional Super50 tournament in the West Indies and for the 2018 ICC World Cricket League Division Three tournament in Oman.

In February 2019, he was named in the United States' Twenty20 International (T20I) squad for their series against the United Arab Emirates. The matches were the first T20I fixtures to be played by the United States cricket team. He made his T20I debut for the United States against the United Arab Emirates on 15 March 2019.

In April 2019, he was named in the United States cricket team's squad for the 2019 ICC World Cricket League Division Two tournament in Namibia. The United States finished in the top four places in the tournament, therefore gaining One Day International (ODI) status. Taylor made his ODI debut for the United States on 27 April 2019, against Papua New Guinea, in the tournament's third-place playoff.

In June 2019, he was named in a 30-man training squad for the United States cricket team, ahead of the Regional Finals of the 2018–19 ICC T20 World Cup Americas Qualifier tournament in Bermuda. Later the same month, he was selected to play for the Montreal Tigers franchise team in the 2019 Global T20 Canada tournament. However, in July 2019, Taylor withdrew from the Global T20 Canada tournament, after signing a 12-month central contract with USA Cricket.

In August 2019, he was named as the vice-captain of the United States' squad for the Regional Finals of the 2018–19 ICC T20 World Cup Americas Qualifier tournament. He was the leading run-scorer for the United States in the tournament, with 144 runs in six matches. In November 2019, he was named as the vice-captain of the United States' squad for the 2019–20 Regional Super50 tournament.

In October 2021, he was named in the American squad for the 2021 ICC Men's T20 World Cup Americas Qualifier tournament in Antigua. In June 2022, Taylor scored his first century in an ODI match, with 114 runs against Nepal in round 13 of the 2019–2023 ICC Cricket World Cup League 2 competition.

Domestic career
In June 2021, he was selected to take part in the Minor League Cricket tournament in the United States following the players' draft.

In March 2023, Taylor was roped into the MI New York squad for the inaugural edition of Major League Cricket in the player draft.

References 

1993 births
Living people
People from Hialeah, Florida
American cricketers
American people of Jamaican descent
Barbados Royals cricketers
African-American sportsmen
ICC Americas cricketers
Cricket in Florida
Jamaica cricketers
United States One Day International cricketers
United States Twenty20 International cricketers
21st-century African-American sportspeople
Wicket-keepers